On Again-Off Again is a 1937 musical comedy film, released by RKO Radio Pictures starring the comedy team Wheeler & Woolsey.

Plot
William Hobbs and Claude Horton are the owners of the drug manufacturing company "Horton and Hobbs' Pink Pills". Although the two couldn't have possibly started the business without each other, they continuously bicker over everything. Eventually, the duo talk their lawyer, George Dilwig, into coming up with a way to split the team up. Annoyed by Horton and Hobbs constantly bothering him, Dilwig sarcastically suggests the two get into a wrestling match. The winner gains full ownership of the company, while the loser becomes the winner's butler for one year.

Production
 Based on the 1914 play "A Pair of Sixes" by Edward Peple.
 Robert Woolsey was suffering from kidney disease throughout production of this film, and was in constant pain.

Cast
Bert Wheeler as William Hobbs
Robert Woolsey as Claude Horton
Marjorie Lord as Florence Cole
Patricia Wilder as Gertie Green
Esther Muir as Nettie Horton
Paul Harvey as Mr. Applegate
Russell Hicks as George Dilwig
George Meeker as Tony
Maxine Jennings as Miss Meeker
Kitty McHugh as Miss Parker
Hal K. Dawson as Sanford
Alec Harford as Slip Grogan
Pat Flaherty as Mr. Green

External links 
 

1937 films
American musical comedy films
Films directed by Edward F. Cline
American black-and-white films
RKO Pictures films
1937 musical comedy films
1930s American films